Bai Tian (born 27 September 1971 in Xi'an, Shaanxi) is a Chinese diplomat who served as the Ambassador of China to Malaysia from November 2017 to November 2020. Before he stepped down in November 2020, he had listed out three incomplete tasks which he hopes for his replacement's ability to complete, ranging from shooting of a film celebrating the China–Malaysia relations and friendship, establishing an international Chinese school to setting up an upscale Chinese tea house in Kuala Lumpur, capital of Malaysia.

References 

Living people
1971 births
Ambassadors of China to Malaysia
People from Xi'an